The Joint Stock Companies Winding-Up Act 1844 (7 & 8 Vict c 111) is an Act of Parliament of the United Kingdom.

Section 1 enabled a company to be made bankrupt in the same way as an individual. The result was that remedies were available only against a company's property.

See also
UK insolvency law
UK bankruptcy law
History of bankruptcy law

Notes

Insolvency law of the United Kingdom
United Kingdom Acts of Parliament 1844